State Highway 99 (SH-99) is a state highway in Idaho that travels from SH-3 in Kendrick to SH-8 in Troy.

Route description
Idaho State Highway 99 begins at an intersection with Idaho State Highway 3 in the community of Kendrick. The highway proceeds northeast, exiting Kendrick, and proceeding into rural area. The highway weaves northeast and northwest for several miles, before bending northwest. The route continues through a small valley, intersecting several small roads while traveling. The roadway proceeds northward before making a large bend northwest, and entering the community of Troy. The highway continues to its northern terminus, an intersection with Idaho State Highway 8.

Major intersections

References

099
Transportation in Latah County, Idaho